Joseph Heste Patterson (August 15, 1912 – May 23, 1939) was an American naval officer who also competed at the 1936 Summer Olympics. He went by "Pat" Patterson while in the Navy.

Early life
A native of Oklahoma City, Oklahoma, Patterson graduated from the United States Naval Academy in 1936. While at the Naval Academy, he competed for the track team. That same year, he finished second in the 400 m hurdles at the US Olympic trials for the 1936 Games in Berlin. At the Berlin Games, he finished fourth in 400 m hurdles event, losing out on the bronze medal to Miguel White of the Philippines by 0.2 seconds.

He married Elizabeth "Betty" Greenlee in 1938.

Naval career
After the Olympics, Patterson served aboard the  cruiser as an ensign. He would serve from May 1936 to May 1938. After transferring to the submarine fleet, Patterson completed training at the submarine school in New London, Connecticut before being assigned to the USS Squalus in October 1938.

Patterson lost his life aboard the Squalus on May 23, 1939 when the main induction valve failed to close off the Isles of Shoals. This caused the aft torpedo room, both engine rooms, and the crew's quarters to be flooded. He was one of 26 men to drown immediately, and the only officer to die in the accident. The rest of the surviving crew was rescued by the USS Falcon led by Lieutenant Commander Charles "Swede" Momsen and the Squalus was refloated where Patterson and his dead crewmates were recovered.

Patterson is buried in Arlington National Cemetery. He was posthumously promoted to Lieutenant (junior grade).

References
 
 Subvert.com memorial to the Squalus.
 Maas, Peter (1999). The Terrible Hours: The man behind the greatest submarine rescue in history. New York: HarperTouch. pp. 15–16.
 Wallechinsky, David and Jaime Loucky (2008). "Track & Field (Men): 400-Meter Hurdles". In The Complete Book of the Olympics: 2008 Edition. London: Aurum Press Limited. p. 163.

1912 births
1939 deaths
Accidental deaths in New Hampshire
American male hurdlers
Athletes (track and field) at the 1936 Summer Olympics
Burials at Arlington National Cemetery
Deaths due to shipwreck
Deaths by drowning in the United States
Navy Midshipmen men's track and field athletes
Olympic track and field athletes of the United States
Sportspeople from Oklahoma City
United States Navy officers